Indirect presidential elections were held in Haiti on 13-14 February 2016 following the annulment of the results of the 2015–16 elections by the Provisional Electoral Council, and after the incumbent president Michel Martelly resigned the presidency on 10 February 2016, leaving Haiti without a president. The members of the National Assembly voted for the provisional President on 13 February 2016 in the first round and on 14 February in the second round. 

Jocelerme Privert of Inite was elected provisional President to serve until the conclusion of the 2016–17 elections. Under a multi-party agreement, Privert was supposed to oversee these elections and hand power to an elected successor within 120 days, by 14 June 2016, though electoral deadlines were missed. Following allegations of fraud in the 2015 elections, Privert created a month-long verification commission to restore legitimacy to the electoral process. In May 2016, the commission audited about 13,000 ballots and determined that the elections had been dishonest and recommended a complete rerun of the election. The rerun election took place on 20 November 2016. The second round had been scheduled for 29 January 2017, but did not take place as Jovenel Moïse was a clear winner in the first round. In the end, Privert continued in office as provisional President until 7 February 2017.

Results

References

2016
2016 in Haiti
2016 elections in the Caribbean
February 2016 events in North America